This is a list of commercial banks in Equatorial Guinea

 BGFIBank Equatorial Guinea (BGFIBank-EG)
 Commercial Bank Guinee Equatoriale (CBGE)
 Caisse Commune d’Epargne et d’Investissement Guinée Equatoriale (CCEI)
BANGE
ECOBANK

External links
 Website of Central Bank of Central African States

See also
 List of banks in Africa
 Central Bank of Central African States

References

 
Banks
Equatorial Guinea
Equatorial Guinea